Sweden will compete at the 2009 World Championships in Athletics from 15–23 August. A team of 23 athletes was announced in preparation for the competition. Selected athletes have achieved one of the competition's qualifying standards.

Team selection

Track and road events

Field and combined events

Results

Men
Track and road events

Field events

Women
Track and road events

Field and combined events

Key: Q = qualification by place, q = qualification by overall place, SB = Seasonal best, DQ = Disqualified, NM = no mark (i.e. no valid result), DNS = Did not start

References
Entry list. European Athletic Association (2009-07-30). Retrieved on 2009-08-16.

External links
Official competition website

Nations at the 2009 World Championships in Athletics
World Championships in Athletics
Sweden at the World Championships in Athletics